Dinar Dyah Ayustine (born 18 October 1993) is an Indonesian badminton player, who plays in the women's singles discipline. She is from PB Djarum Kudus, a badminton club from Kudus of Central Java and joined to the club since 2004.

Achievements

BWF International Challenge/Series 
Women's singles

  BWF International Challenge tournament
  BWF International Series tournament

Performance timeline

National team 
 Senior level

Individual competitions 
 Senior level

Record against selected opponents 
Head to head (H2H) against World Superseries Final finalists, World Championships semifinalists, and Olympic quarterfinalists.

  Yao Xue 0–1
  Saina Nehwal 0–1
  Sung Ji-hyun 0–1

References

External links 
 

1993 births
Living people
People from Karanganyar Regency
Sportspeople from Central Java
Indonesian female badminton players
Competitors at the 2015 Southeast Asian Games
Competitors at the 2017 Southeast Asian Games
Southeast Asian Games bronze medalists for Indonesia
Southeast Asian Games medalists in badminton
21st-century Indonesian women
20th-century Indonesian women